List of all members of Stortinget in the period 1989 to 1993.  The list includes all who were elected to Stortinget.

There were a total of 165 representatives, distributed among 63 to the Norwegian Labour Party, 37 to Conservative Party, 22 to Progress Party, 17 to Socialist Left Party,
14 to Christian Democrats, 11 to Centre Party and 1 to Framtid for Finnmark.

The 8 the leveling seats went to Akershus (3), Hordaland (1), Oslo (1), Rogaland (2) and Østfold (1).

Aust-Agder

Vest-Agder

Akershus

3 Leveling seats.

Buskerud

Finnmark

Hedmark

Hordaland

1 Leveling seat.

Møre and Romsdal

Nordland

Oppland

Oslo

1 Leveling seat.

Rogaland

2 Leveling seats.

Sogn and Fjordane

Telemark

Troms

Nord-Trøndelag

Sør-Trøndelag

Vestfold

Østfold

1 Leveling seat.

 
Parliament of Norway, 1989–93